Shawn Gabriel Sterling Weinstein (born July 30, 1985) is a Filipino-American former professional basketball player who played from 2008 to 2015 in the Israeli League and the Philippine Basketball Association. He is currently an analyst and sports commentator for Fox Sports Asia.

He played three seasons for St. Edwards University (Austin, Texas) in the NCAA Men's Division and two seasons for the Elitzur Maccabi Netanya Israel in the Ligat HaAl (Israeli Super-league).

High school

Shawn Weinstein attended Palos Verdes Peninsula High School in southern California. There he had a tremendous senior season averaging 28.5 points per game and finished tied with Jordan Farmar as the number three scorer in all of southern California.  He was named Co-Bay League Most Outstanding Player with Aarron Afflalo and was selected First team All Area by the Daily Breeze. Weinstein was named a first team Jewish All-American and a McDonald's All American nominee.

College career
In his three years at St. Edwards University, they won three conference titles in Heartland Conference. Weinstein was the 2007 Conference Player of the Year and a two-time First Team All Conference Selection.

He was inducted into the St. Edwards Athletic Hall of Fame in 2016 and named to the Heartland Conference 20th Anniversary team in 2019, which recognizes the 10 best players from the Heartland Conference over the last 20 years.

Professional career
On August 6, 2010, Weinstein was drafted 10th overall by the Meralco Bolts. He made his debut in the opening of the PBA 36th season on October 3, 2010 where he scored six points and tallied five assists.

References

1985 births
Living people
Barako Bull Energy players
Basketball players from California
Filipino men's basketball players
American sportspeople of Filipino descent
Jewish men's basketball players
Maccabi Hod HaSharon players
Meralco Bolts players
People from Rancho Palos Verdes, California
Point guards
St. Edward's Hilltoppers men's basketball players
TNT Tropang Giga players
American men's basketball players
Alaska Aces (PBA) draft picks
Citizens of the Philippines through descent